The Seven Deadly Sins is a Japanese manga series written and illustrated by Nakaba Suzuki. It began its serialization in the manga anthology Weekly Shōnen Magazine on October 10, 2012. Its individual chapters have been collected into forty-one tankōbon volumes by Kodansha, the first released on February 15, 2013. The story begins with Elizabeth, the princess of Britannia, which has been overthrown by the brutal Holy Knights, finding Meliodas, the leader of the titular Seven Deadly Sins, a group of knights which was disbanded years ago after being blamed for plotting to overthrow Britannia. Convinced that the Sins are the only group of knights powerful enough to defeat the Holy Knights, Elizabeth joins Meliodas in his similar journey of finding the other members of his now-disbanded group.

The series is licensed for English language release in North America by Kodansha USA, who published the first volume on March 11, 2014. As the series is published in Japan, it is also released simultaneously in English digitally by Crunchyroll in over 170 countries.

Volume list

Spin-offs

Mayoe! The Seven Deadly Sins Academy!
 is a comedic spin-off of the series by Juichi Yamaki that re-imagines the titular Seven Deadly Sins as high school students. It was serialized in Bessatsu Shōnen Magazine from its September issue on August 9, 2014 to its November issue on October 8, 2016, and collected into four tankōbon volumes between February 17, 2015 and December 16, 2016.

The Seven Deadly Sins Production
 is a comedic spin-off by Chiemi Sakamoto that imagines the series' characters as actors performing in a live-action television show. It began in the January 2016 issue of Aria on November 28, 2015 and ended on October 28, 2017, with the chapters collected into four tankōbon volumes between December 16, 2016 and November 17, 2017.

The Seven Deadly Sins: King's Road to Manga
 is a comedic yonkoma written by Masataka Ono, that depicts King as an aspiring manga artist. It began on February 20, 2016 in Magazine Special, before being transferred to the smartphone and tablet application Manga Box on February 1, 2017 and ending later that year. Its chapters were collected into three tankōbon volumes between August 17, 2016 and July 14, 2017.

The Seven Deadly Sins: Seven Days

 is a manga illustrated by Yō Kokukuji that adapts Mamoru Iwasa's novel Seven Days, showing how Ban and Elaine met in more detail. It was serialized in Shōnen Magazine Edge from the February 2017 issue released on January 17 to its October 2017 issue that was released in September. Its chapters were collected into two tankōbon volumes between July 14 and October 17, 2017.

The Vampires of Edinburgh

References

Seven Deadly Sins
Chapters